Sobko is a gender-neutral Ukrainian surname that may refer to
Aleksandr Sobko (born 1982), Russian football player
Sergei Sobko (born 1949), Russian politician
Vadim Sobko (1912–1981), Ukrainian writer
Vitaliy Sobko (born 1987), Ukrainian football midfielder

See also
 

Ukrainian-language surnames